Thibilis (a.k.a. Tibilis) was a Roman and Byzantine era town in what was Numidia but is today northeast Algeria. The site has extensive Roman and Byzantine ruins.

History
The numerous Latin inscriptions discovered on the site of Thibilis provided indications on the status and magistrates of this city: during the Early Empire, Thibilis was first a pagus dependent on the Cirtaian confederacy which united Cirta, Rusicade, Chullu and Milève. Enjoying a certain autonomy, the city was administered by two magistri of annual mandate, assisted by one or two aediles.

During the reigns of Antoninus Pius and Marcus Aurelius, notables of Thibilis gained the highest office of the Imperial administration, Quintus Antistius Adventus Aquilinus Postumus, consul suffect about 167, and his son Lucius Antistius Burrus, son-in-law of Marcus Aurelius And consul in 181.

Thibilis gained the rank of municipality headed by two duumviri  between 260  and 268  which corresponds to the period estimated for the dissolution of the confederacy.
Local cults included flamen Augusti for imperial worship and Saturni (priest of Saturn) and a local deity, Bacax and Magna Mater deorum Idaea, the Great Mother of the Gods.

See also
 List of cultural assets of Algeria

References

External links 
 Images of Thibilis in Manar al-Athar digital heritage photo archive

Archaeological sites in Algeria
Roman towns and cities in Mauretania Caesariensis
Ancient Berber cities
4th-century disestablishments
Constantine, Algeria